Arlan Keith Andrews, Sr. (born 1940) is an American engineer and writer of science fiction and non-fiction. He attended New Mexico State University, where he earned bachelor, master, and doctorate degrees in mechanical engineering. Since 1971, he has published three novels, three collections, over 30 non-fiction articles, almost 70 short fiction works, and multiple poems.

After helping to found the Libertarian Party of North Carolina, he was their candidate in the 1976 North Carolina gubernatorial election. In the early 1990s, he founded Sigma, a think tank of science fiction authors and academics that consults for the United States government. He was awarded a fellowship by the American Society of Mechanical Engineers in 1991 and 1992, the latter including a position in the Office of Science and Technology Policy.

His works have received Analog Awards for his non-fiction and short fiction from Analog Science Fiction and Fact, including a first place award for the non-fiction "Single Stage to Infinity!", and two-second place awards for the short fiction "Manufacturing Magic" and "Flow". "Flow" also received a nomination for the 2015 Hugo Award for Best Novella, finishing in second place.

Biography
Arlan Keith Andrews was born in 1940. He attended New Mexico State University, earning a Bachelor of Science degree in 1964, a Master of Science degree in 1966, and a Doctor of Science degree in 1969, all in mechanical engineering. He has been a registered professional engineer since July 1969.

His first published fiction was "Asimov as Dirty Old Man", published in 1971 in Sandworm, a fanzine edited by Robert Vardeman. His first work published in Analog Science Fiction and Fact was "Glossolalia", which appeared in the July 1982 issue. Since then, he has published more than 35 works in Analog, including short fiction, non-fiction articles, and poetry. His fiction and non-fiction also appeared in magazines and anthologies such as Science Fiction Review, Science Fiction Age, the Journal of the British Interplanetary Society, Mechanical Engineering-CIME, Astrology Plus!, InfoWorld, Collaps Magazine, Amazing Stories, Pulphouse: The Hardback Magazine, Sci Phi Journal, Mensa Bulletin and Integra, the journal of Intertel.

Andrews was one of the founders of the Libertarian Party of North Carolina (LPNC), and was their candidate for the 1976 North Carolina gubernatorial election, where he garnered 4,764 votes (0.29%). He founded Sigma, a think tank of science fiction authors and academics, in the early 1990s.

He was the guest of honor at the 2016 LPNC convention, which celebrated the party's 40th anniversary.

Bibliography

Non-fiction
 
 "Feynman's Philosophical Foresight: There's Plenty of Room at the Bottom" in Science Fiction Review, March 1992, edited by Elton Elliott (SFR Publications)
 "Money Micromachines and Molecules: It's A Long Way Down" in Science Fiction Review, April 1992, edited by Elton Elliott (SFR Publications)
 "Drexler's Diminutive Dreams: Nanofacturing the Future" in Science Fiction Review, May 1992, edited by Elton Elliott (SFR Publications)
 "Manufacturing Magic" in Analog Science Fiction and Fact, September 1992, edited by Stanley Schmidt
 "Do the logistics of time travel make a paradox of reality?" in Science Fiction Age, November 1992, edited by Scott Edelman (Sovereign Media)
 "Will the mastery of nanotechnology allow us to tame the wild molecule?" in Science Fiction Age, January 1993, edited by Scott Edelman (Sovereign Media)
 "Will a Machine's Artificial Intelligence Allow Us to Replace a Man?" in Science Fiction Age, March 1993, edited by Scott Edelman (Sovereign Media)
 "Manufacturing: The New Competition" in The President's Report to Congress on Science and Technology (April 1993)
 "Single Stage to Infinity!" in Analog Science Fiction and Fact, June 1993, edited by Stanley Schmidt
 "Cryonic suspension technology may mean an end to death." in Science Fiction Age, July 1993, edited by Scott Edelman (Sovereign Media)
 "The search for alien intelligence may alter what it means to be human." in Science Fiction Age, September 1993, edited by Scott Edelman (Sovereign Media)
 "Virtual Reality will let you visit the alien worlds inside your computer." in Science Fiction Age, November 1993, edited by Scott Edelman (Sovereign Media)
 "Everything you think you know about scientists may be wrong." in Science Fiction Age, January 1994, edited by Scott Edelman (Sovereign Media)
 "Finally, space travel the way God (and Robert Heinlein) intended it to be." in Science Fiction Age, May 1994, edited by Scott Edelman (Sovereign Media)
 "When the end of the world arrives, science fiction will be ready to survive it." in Science Fiction Age, September 1994, edited by Scott Edelman (Sovereign Media)
 "When Earth has its first contact with alien beings, will we be ready?" in Science Fiction Age, January 1995, edited by Scott Edelman (Sovereign Media)
 "The grass is always greener on the other side of the universe." in Science Fiction Age, September 1995, edited by Scott Edelman (Sovereign Media)
 "Is the threat of global warming politics as usual or a true environmental menace?" in Science Fiction Age, May 1996, edited by Scott Edelman (Sovereign Media)
 "If today's politics are troubling, then what will we do about tomorrow's?" in Science Fiction Age, November 1996, edited by Scott Edelman (Sovereign Media)
 "Ice on the Moon may allow us to venture into the rest of our solar system." in Science Fiction Age, May 1997, edited by Scott Edelman (Sovereign Media)
 "Small Beginnings" in Mechanical Engineering-CIME (January 2005)
 "Hydraulics and the Ancients" in Atlantis Rising (July 2006)
 "SIGMA: Summing Up Speculation" in Analog Science Fiction and Fact, September 2012, edited by Stanley Schmidt
 "Interstellar Colonization and Multi-Generation Spaceships: Getting There is Half the Fun" in Journal of the British Interplanetary Society (July 2013)
 "Homesteading to the Stars: Colony vs. Crew" in Analog Science Fiction and Fact, December 2013, edited by Trevor Quachri
 "Nanotechnology from the Start" in Mechanical Engineering-CIME (November 2014)
 "Sixty Astounding Years—A Personal Retrospective" in Analog Science Fiction and Fact, July–August 2014, edited by Trevor Quachri
 "The Single-Person Emergency Atmospheric Reentry Device (SPEARED)" with Tom Ligon and Stephanie Osborn in Analog Science Fiction and Fact (December 2014)

Fiction
Andrews has published fiction under multiple variations of his name, including Arlan Keith Andrews, Sr., Arlan Andrews, Sr., and Arlan Andrews.

Novels
 Timelost: Computer Adventure with Kris Andrews and Joe Giarratano (1983, Que Corporation)
 Valley of the Shaman: A Journey of Discovery (2012, Saywite Publications, ebook)
 Silicon Blood (2017, Hydra Publications)

Collections
 Other Heads and Other Tales (July 2011, Saywite Publications, ebook)
 Future Flash (2016, Hydra Publications)
 The Great Moon Hoax (The Way It Really Happened) and Other Apollo Tribute Stories (July 2019, self-published, ebook)

Short fiction
 "Asimov as Dirty Old Man" in Sandworm #12, edited by Robert Vardeman (1971)
 "Sherman's Axiom" in Astrology Plus!, January 1975 (January 1975, Gemini Enterprises)
 "Glossolalia" in Analog Science Fiction/Science Fact, July 1982, edited by Stanley Schmidt
 "Making sure the OCTOPUS is kept at arm's length" in InfoWorld, April 4, 1983
 Probability Zero: A series of humorous science fiction short stories.
 "Information Implosion" in Analog Science Fiction/Science Fact, Mid-September 1983, edited by Stanley Schmidt
 "QTL" as Arlan Andrews in Analog Science Fiction/Science Fact, February 1987, edited by Stanley Schmidt
 "Occidental Injury" in Analog Science Fiction/Science Fact, October 1987, edited by Stanley Schmidt
 "Surfaced Tension" in Analog Science Fiction/Science Fact, January 1988, edited by Stanley Schmidt
 "Effacing the Truth" in Analog Science Fiction and Fact, July–August 1998, edited by Stanley Schmidt
 "What Engineers Know" in Analog Science Fiction and Fact, November 2004, edited by Stanley Schmidt
 "...Plus c'est la Même Chose" in Analog Science Fiction and Fact, July–August 2011, edited by Stanley Schmidt
 "Wreck Support" in Analog Science Fiction and Fact, September 2013, edited by Trevor Quachri
 "Critical Path" in Analog Science Fiction/Science Fact, December 1983, edited by Stanley Schmidt
 "Present Worth" in Collaps Magazine (1983)
 "Capitol Punishment" in Analog Science Fiction/Science Fact, Mid-December 1984, edited by Stanley Schmidt
 "The Hephaestus Mission" in Analog Science Fiction/Science Fact, Mid-December 1986, edited by Stanley Schmidt
 "Epiphany" in Analog Science Fiction/Science Fact, September 1987, edited by Stanley Schmidt
 "Snuff" in Lan's Lantern, August 1988, edited by Lan Laskowski
 "Mystery of the Space Pirates" in Pulsar! No. 11, Fall 1988, edited by A. E. Ubelhor
 "Indian Summa" in Analog Science Fiction and Fact, January 1989, edited by Stanley Schmidt
 "Rite of Privacy" in Amazing Stories, January 1989, edited by Patrick Lucien Price (TSR)
 "A Visit to the Nanodentist" in Amazing Stories, May 1989, edited by Patrick Lucien Price (TSR)
 "An Hour to Kill" in Pulphouse: The Hardback Magazine, Issue 4: Summer 1989, edited by Kristine Kathryn Rusch
 "Renaissance Manna" in Amazing Stories, January 1991, edited by Patrick Lucien Price (TSR)
 "Silicon Bouquets" in Science Fiction Review, March 1992, edited by Elton Elliott (SFR Publications)
 "The Eggs in the Streets" in Amazing Stories, June 1992, edited by Kim Mohan (TSR)
 "Interfaces " in Analog Science Fiction and Fact, August 1992, edited by Stanley Schmidt
 "A Dangerous Knowledge" in Science Fiction Age, November 1992, edited by Scott Edelman (Sovereign Media)
 "Day of the Dancing Dinosaur" in Science Fiction Age, March 1993, edited by Scott Edelman (Sovereign Media)
 "A Little Waltz Music" in Amazing Stories, March 1993, edited by Kim Mohan (TSR)
 "Hail, Columbia!" in Analog Science Fiction and Fact, August 1993, edited by Stanley Schmidt
 "Other Heads" in Amazing Stories, August 1993, edited by Kim Mohan (TSR)
 "The Twilight of the Guards, or, The Plowshare Conundrum" in Analog Science Fiction and Fact, December 1994, edited by Stanley Schmidt
 "The Roswell Accident" in Analog Science Fiction and Fact, Mid-December 1994, edited by Stanley Schmidt
 "Heinlein's Children" in Analog Science Fiction and Fact, January 1995, edited by Stanley Schmidt
 "2020: The Chimera Engineer" in Virtual Manufacturing Proceedings (March 1995, University of New Mexico Press)
 "Sins of the Mothers" in Nanodreams, edited by Elton Elliott (1995, Baen Books)
 "Souls on Ice" in How to Save the World, edited by Charles Sheffield (1995, Tor Books)
 "Only Time Travelers Need Apply" with Stanley Schmidt in Analog Science Fiction and Fact, June 1996, edited by Stanley Schmidt
 "WWW: The Web We Wove" in Analog Science Fiction and Fact, November 1997, edited by Stanley Schmidt
 "Parameters of Dream Flight" in More Amazing Stories, edited by Kim Mohan (1998, Tor Books)
 "The Great Moon Hoax" in Ideomancer, 2001, edited by Chris Clarke and Amber van Dyk (August 2001)
 "The Trouble with Grampa" in Analog Science Fiction and Fact, October 2002, edited by Stanley Schmidt
 "Lament for Lost Atlanta" in Alt Hist, Issue 1, October 2010, edited by Mark Lord (Alt Hist Press)
 "The Alien at the Alamo" in Analog Science Fiction and Fact, October 2010, edited by Stanley Schmidt
 "Pilots of the Purple Twilight" in an internal company publication (2010)
 "A Meeting on the Moon" in Other Heads and Other Tales: Stories from the Future (July 2011, Saywite Publications)
 "The Bar of the Worlds" in Other Heads and Other Tales: Stories from the Future (July 2011, Saywite Publications)
 "Riders on the Storm" in Alt Hist, Issue 3, November 2011, edited by Mark Lord (November 2011, Alt Hist Press)
 "Thaw" in Analog Science Fiction and Fact, July–August 2013, edited by Trevor Quachri
 "Flow" in Analog Science Fiction and Fact, November 2014, edited by Trevor Quachri
 "Foundation and Zombies" in Stupefying Stories, November 2014, edited by Bruce Bethke (November 2014, Rampant Loon Press)
 "Orion, Rising" in Analog Science Fiction and Fact, January–February 2015, edited by Trevor Quachri
 
 "War, with Incident" in Baby Shoes: 100 Stories by 100 Authors, edited by Jason Brick and Dani J. Caile (2015)
 "Carbon Zero" in Visions 2100: Stories from Your Future, edited by John O'Brien (2015, Vivid Publishing)
 "Trajectories of the Heart" in Trajectories: Stories of Exploration, edited by Dave Creek (2016, Hydra Publications)
 "Fall " in Analog Science Fiction and Fact, July–August 2016, edited by Trevor Quachri
 "Sister: Loki" in Analog Science Fiction and Fact, December 2016, edited by Trevor Quachri
 "Anticlimatic" in Sci Phi Journal, January 2017, edited by Jason Rennie and Ben Zwycky (Superversive Press)
 "Shirt Story" in Freedom's Light: Short Stories, edited by Lindsay Galloway, Kia Heavey, and Matthew Souders (January 2017, Victory Fiction)
 "En Soleil" in Sci Phi Journal, March 2017, edited by Jason Rennie and Ben Zwycky (Superversive Press)
 "The Secret Jew" in Mensa Bulletin, October 2017 (October 2017, American Mensa)
 "M. A. G. A. I." in MAGA 2020 & Beyond, edited by Marina Fontaine, Jason Rennie, and Dawn Witzke (2017, Superversive Press)
 "SpaceBook" in Astounding Frontiers, #November 5, 2017, edited by David Hallquist, Jason Rennie, and Ben Zwycky (Superversive Press)
 "I Hate Mars!" in Planetary Anthology: Earth, edited by Dawn Witzke (018, Superversive Press)
 "Subsonic Dreams" in Planetary Anthology: Jupiter, edited by Julie A. Pascal (2019, Superversive Press)
 "Worst Contact" in Planetary Anthology: Pluto, edited by Richard Paolinelli and Dawn Witzke (2019, Tuscany Bay Books)
 "Creativity" in Planetary Anthology: Uranus, edited by Christopher Wilson (2020, Tuscany Bay Books)

Poetry
 "The Rime of the Ancient Engineer" in U.S. Coast Guard Engineer's Digest, Fall 1980
 "Ozma, revisited" in Cosmic Search, Spring 1981 (April 1981)
 "Science, Fiction." in Analog Science Fiction/Science Fact, June 1982, edited by Stanley Schmidt
 "Woooooooooolves!" in Yearnings No. 1, 1982, edited by Jane Fancher (Warp Graphics)
 "Ancient Ages" in Fantasy Book, March 1987, edited by Dennis Mallonee and Nick Smith (Fantasy Book Enterprises)
 "Fantasy of a '50s Fan" in Amazing Stories, July 1988, edited by Patrick Lucien Price (TSR)
 "An Ode to E.R.B." in Amazing Stories, March 1989, edited by Patrick Lucien Price (TSR)
 "The Mars Farewell" in Amazing Stories, May 1989, edited by Patrick Lucien Price (TSR)

Awards and honors

Sigma
Sigma is a think tank of science fiction authors and academics, founded by Andrews in the early 1990s, when he worked at the White House Science Office. Initial members of the group had one or more advanced degrees, though members since the founding have not been required to have them. Members have included Andrews, Greg Bear, Yoji Kondo, Larry Niven, Jerry Pournelle, and Sage Walker.

References

External links
 
 Arlan Andrews, Sr. at the Internet Speculative Fiction Database
 Sigma: The Science Fiction Think Tank

1940 births
Living people
American male non-fiction writers
American science fiction writers
American technology writers
Analog Science Fiction and Fact people
Engineers from North Carolina
Mensans
North Carolina Libertarians
Novelists from North Carolina
Scientists from North Carolina